C Album is the third studio album of the Japanese duo KinKi Kids. It was released on August 4, 1999, and debuted at the top of the Oricon charts, selling 451,230 copies in its first week. The album was certified double platinum by the RIAJ for 800,000 copies shipped to stores in Japan.

Track listing

References

External links
 C Album Information

1999 albums
KinKi Kids albums